Tekin Kurtulus (born 16 September 1968, Usak, Turkey) is a German actor of Turkish descent. He is the older brother of actor Mehmet Kurtuluş.

Filmography

References

External links 
 Company Hamburg: Das Team, companyhamburg.de (1. Dezember 2006) 
 kick-media ag: Tekin Kurtulus, pool.position.de (1. Dezember 2006) 
 

1968 births
German people of Turkish descent
People from Salzgitter
German male television actors
Living people
Turkish male singers
Turkish male film actors
People from Uşak
Turkish emigrants to Germany
21st-century German male actors